Edward J. "Mickey" Davis (born June 16, 1950) is an American former basketball player in the National Basketball Association (NBA). He played college basketball at Duquesne University, where he led his team in rebounds per game and points per game. He left after his junior season to start his professional career with the Pittsburgh Condors of the American Basketball Association. He was later drafted by the Milwaukee Bucks in the seventh round of the 1972 NBA draft and played with the team until 1976.

Davis' professional career was mostly unheralded, but he did garner some national attention during the 1974 NBA Finals with the Bucks.  With starting guard Lucius Allen hurt and the rest of the Bucks' guards unable to handle the defensive pressure of the Boston Celtics, Davis, an adept ballhandler, was called upon to play point guard (unusual at the time at 6'7") alongside Oscar Robertson for much of the series and helped the Bucks extend the Celtics to seven games.

On January 6 of that season, in perhaps his best regular season game, Davis scored 22 points, grabbed 8 rebounds, and recorded 4 assists in a loss against the Washington Bullets while starting in place of injured all-star teammate Bob Dandridge.

NBA career statistics

Regular season

|-
| align="left" | 1971–72
| align="left" | Pittsburgh
| 23 || - || 5.5 || .397 || .000 || .700 || 1.8 || 0.4 || - || - || 2.8
|-
| align="left" | 1972–73
| align="left" | Milwaukee
| 74 || - || 14.1 || .438 || - || .826 || 3.1 || 1.0 || - || - || 5.1
|-
| align="left" | 1973–74
| align="left" | Milwaukee
| 73 || - || 13.9 || .504 || - || .830 || 3.1 || 1.2 || 0.4 || 0.1 || 5.9
|-
| align="left" | 1974–75
| align="left" | Milwaukee
| 75 || - || 14.4 || .479 || - || .886 || 3.2 || 1.1 || 0.4 || 0.1 || 5.7
|-
| align="left" | 1975–76
| align="left" | Milwaukee
| 45 || - || 9.1 || .362 || - || .794 || 1.9 || 0.8 || 0.3 || 0.0 || 3.6
|-
| align="left" | 1976–77
| align="left" | Milwaukee
| 19 || - || 8.7 || .426 || - || .920 || 1.5 || 1.1 || 0.3 || 0.2 || 4.3
|- class="sortbottom"
| style="text-align:center;" colspan="2"| Career
| 309 || - || 12.4 || .455 || .000 || .835 || 2.7 || 1.0 || 0.4 || 0.1 || 5.0
|}

Playoffs

|-
| align="left" | 1972–73
| align="left" | Milwaukee
| 6 || - || 9.0 || .353 || - || 1.000 || 2.0 || 0.8 || - || - || 2.3
|-
| align="left" | 1973–74
| align="left" | Milwaukee
| 15 || - || 16.3 || .492 || - || .917 || 2.3 || 0.8 || 0.3 || 0.1 || 5.7
|- class="sortbottom"
| style="text-align:center;" colspan="2"| Career
| 21 || - || 14.2 || .463 || - || .923 || 2.2 || 0.8 || 0.3 || 0.1 || 4.8
|}

Personal life and post-basketball career 
He is the brother of former NBA player Brad Davis. 
After his playing days, he worked as a regional sales manager for the Miller Brewing Company. He was elected to the Beaver County Sports Hall of Fame in 1985. He has four grown children, and, as of 2021, lives in Florida with his wife, Linda.

References

1950 births
Living people
American men's basketball players
Basketball players from Pennsylvania
Duquesne Dukes men's basketball players
Milwaukee Bucks draft picks
Milwaukee Bucks players
People from Rochester, Pennsylvania
Pittsburgh Condors players
Forwards (basketball)
Guards (basketball)